East Timor, also known as Timor-Leste and officially as the Democratic Republic of Timor-Leste, competed at the 2014 Winter Olympics in Sochi, Russia from 7 to 23 February 2014. The country made its debut at the Winter Olympics.

Competitors

Alpine skiing 

According to the final quota allocation released on January 20, 2014, East Timor had one athlete in qualification position. Goutt Gonçalves is the son of a French father and his mother is from East Timor, allowing him to compete for the country. On December 29 in a race in Serbia Goutt Gonçalves managed to lower his point total to below 140 and officially qualify for the games. By qualifying for the event, he also became the first athlete from his country (at any Olympic Games) who has not received a wildcard to compete, but has qualified by meeting the qualification standard. Goutt Gonçalves spent $75,000 to allow him to qualify and compete at the Games.

References

External links 

 
 

Nations at the 2014 Winter Olympics
2014
Winter Olympics